La Nave de Marley (English:Marley's ship) was a television entertainment genre which aired in Argentina by the television channel Telefe . In this program different games, sketches and experiments were performed. It was released on January 6, 2014 and ended on April 24 the same year. It was presented by Marley accompanied by Florencia Peña, Noelia Marzol, Jey Mammon and Nazareno Móttola.

Cast

Main

Program sections
Machine Cloner: was used in the first program. First Noelia income and on the other side appeared Jey dress like her; later he entered Marley and the other side Nazareno appeared dressed like Marley.
Games Ship: Every day new games are made.
Experiment On the ship: Like games every day new experiments are performed. 
Avenida Brazil By 1600: Segment where the Brazilian novel also issued by the chain Telefe parody. It is interpreted by the protagonists of the ship.

Games Ship
Of Head: Here participants must perform various tests using only their heads.
Quiet, please: In this game the participants perform tests noiselessly as the game is controlled by a VU meter.
Who is the Clone?: In this game the participant lies face down on a stretcher and begins to massage the guest as he asks questions to guess who massaged.
Say it With Clay: A charades but making shapes with clay.
Giratron: Holding a giant needle participants must answer questions without falling into the water.
In Line: Here the Implementation of the ship where users of the same participants eliminated presented in the program and show their talents used; until there is a winner.

Parodies
Casados con Hijos
El manosanta está cargado
El Chavo del 8
Sambucetti (Poné a Francella)
La peluquería de don Mateo

App
It was launched an application called La Nave de Marley for Android and Apple devices which was used to play live with the program from home.

External links
Official website

References

Argentine game shows
América TV original programming
2014 Argentine television series debuts
2014 Argentine television series endings
2010s game shows